Colvin Garfield Butler (July 17, 1880 – April 15, 1961) was an American farmer, Presbyterian clergyman, and politician.

Butler was born in Perham, Otter Tail County, Minnesota. He went to the Perham elementary schools and graduated from the Kennedy Secondary School (formerly the Fergus Falls High School) in Fergus Falls, Minnesota. He went to the Park Region Luther College, Hamline University, Presbyterian Theological Seminary, in Omaha, Nebraska, and Buena Vista University in Sioux City, Iowa. Butler lived in Fergus Falls, Minnesota with his wife and family. He served in the Minnesota House of Representatives in 1939 and 1940 and in the Minnesota Senate from 1943 t0 1950. Butler died at his home in Fergus Falls, Minnesota.

References

1880 births
1961 deaths
People from Fergus Falls, Minnesota
People from Perham, Minnesota
American Presbyterian ministers
Farmers from Minnesota
Buena Vista University alumni
Hamline University alumni
Presbyterian Theological Seminary at Omaha alumni
Members of the Minnesota House of Representatives
Minnesota state senators